

Transmission and lifespan 

TSWV, which is transmitted by thrips, causes serious losses in economically important crops and it is one of the most economically devastating plant viruses in the world. The circulative propagative transmission of TSWV is carried out by at least ten different species of thrips. The most common species is Frankliniella occidentalis (western flower thrips) as it is the vector that predominantly transmits TSWV globally and in greenhouses. The rapid developmental and reproductive rate of the thrips contributes to the spread of TSWV. The amount of time it takes for insects to acquire the virus (acquisition period) and the amount of time it takes for the virus to move from the insect to the plant (inoculation) for TSWV varies depends on the vector species. For Frankliniella occidentalis, the acquisition and inoculation of TSWV can be as short as 5 minutes. However, the acquisition and inoculation periods for optimal transmission is 21.3 hours and 42.7 hours, respectively.

Transmission of TSWV can only occur when larvae stage thrips acquire TSWV. The larvae stage for thrips lasts around 1–3 days. TSWV is acquired by thrips when they feed on infected plants. Adult thrips cannot be infected with TSWV as their midgut barrier successfully prevents infection. However, thrips that have successfully become infected with TSWV in the larvae stage can transmit the virus throughout their lifetime. In order to protect their eggs, thrips insert their eggs into various types of plant tissue. Eggs can be found in the stems, leaves, or flowers of plants.  Thrips hatch in 2–3 days and complete their life cycle in 20–30 days. Adult thrips feed on the flower bud, stem and leaf parts of the plant.

Hosts and symptoms 

TSWV infects a variety of hosts, contributing to its global economic impact on crops. There are over a thousand different hosts for TSWV. The host range of TSWV includes agronomically important crops like tomatoes and tobacco. The symptoms of TSWV vary from host to host. There is also variability of symptoms within a single type of host due to the age of the plant, nutrition and the environment (especially temperature). Common symptoms include stunting, ringspots on fruit and necrosis of leaves. There are many different strains of TSWV, and differences in symptoms may also be attributed to the differences in the number of strains present.

Genome, phylogeny, and evolution 
Tomato spotted wilt virus (TSWV) is a spherical negative-sense RNA virus that has a diameter between 80 and 110 nanometers. TSWV tripartite genome are named RNAs L (8.9 kb), M (4.8 kb), and S (2.9 kb). The RNA S has two genes which encode nucleocapsid (N) and nonstructural protein (NSs), respectively.

p202/3WT, Tarquinia, and p105 isolates were always positioned in three different lineages according to phylogenetic analysis based on full genome, RdRp, GcGn, NSm, N, and NSs genes. TSWV isolates from worldwide shared high nucleotide and amino acid identities in N gene region. Additionally, the highly conserved N gene was found to be under very strong negative selection pressures with estimated dN/dS values = 0.0638 and 0.0557.

Management 
Prevention is key in managing TSWV. Once a plant becomes infected with TSWV, there are no practical ways to cure the virus infected plant. The most efficient method of containing this disease is genetic resistance. There are several different resistance genes identified in multiple crops. In some crops the resistance genes have been effective, however, in others, some strains of TSWV have been discovered to overcome the resistance gene, such as the Sw-5 resistance gene in tomato. The Sw-5 resistance gene in tomato is a dominant resistant gene. The Sw-5 gene gives resistance to the TSWV through a hypersensitive response. A hypersensitive response is when the plant cells that surround the infection undergo cell death which would then deprive the virus of the cell machinery it needs to replicate and infect the plant further. There have been several strains of TSWV detected in countries such as Australia, Spain and the United States that can overcome the Sw-5 resistant gene. However, those strains of TSWV have not been spread worldwide so the Sw-5 gene is still useful.

Other important prevention techniques include buying virus and thrips-free transplants and managing thrips populations.  Introducing species that naturally prey on thrips, such as the minute pirate bugs (Orius insidiosus) and big eyed bugs (Geocoris punctipes), may help reduce transmission of TSWV. Insecticides are not an efficient way to decrease the vector population because the vectors rapidly develop resistance. Removing weeds and infected plants is a good way to prevent more infections in the greenhouse. Sanitation practices such as the destruction or removal of old crops by plowing or physical removal are often used in the field.

References

External links 
 
 

Viral plant pathogens and diseases
Tospoviridae